Cherokee is a member of the Iroquoian language family.

In 1824 the first portion of the Bible was translated into the Cherokee language: John 3, translated by a native Cherokee, ᎠᏥ (At-see, also known as John Arch). It was circulated in manuscript, and received with wonderful avidity, being copied hundreds of times. He completed the Gospel of John by 1824 The complete New Testament was translated in September 1825 by David Brown, also a native Cherokee; this was also circulated in manuscript form, as a type for the Cherokee syllabary had not yet been created. Both Archer and Brown translated the full New Testament into Cherokee.

The first actual printing of a Bible portion in Cherokee appeared in the Missionary Herald of December, 1827, and consisted of the first verse of Genesis, translated by Samuel Worcester. In 1828, David Brown, together with a man named George Lowrey, translated Matthew. This was printed in the Cherokee Phoenix from April 3, 1828 till July 29, 1829. It is uncertain whether this translation was ever published in book form or not.

Samuel Worcester, and Elias Boudinot, editor of the Cherokee Phoenix, published a revised translation of Matthew in 1829. This was published by the Cherokee National Press, New Echota. In the second edition, published in 1832, there is a statement that this translation had been "compared with the translation of George Lowrey and David Brown." A third edition was printed by the Park Hill Mission Press in 1840.

Worcester and Boudinot continued with translation, publishing Acts in 1833 and John in 1838. Worcester, together with Stephen Foreman, published John 1–3 in 1840, 1 and 2 Timothy in 1844, James in 1847, 1 and 2 Peter in 1848, Luke in 1850, Exodus in 1853, Genesis in 1856, Mark in 1857, and Romans through Ephesians in 1858. With the assistance of Charles C. Torrey, they published Philippians through 2 Thessalonians, Titus through Hebrews and Jude through Revelation in 1859. Besides the first three books translated together with Boudinot, Matthew (1829), Acts (1833), and John (1838), which were published in New Echota, Georgia, all the rest of Worcester's texts were published by the Park Hill Mission Press. In the meantime, Evan and John B. Jones had published Mark 1 and 2 Thessalonians, Titus, Jude, and Philemon in 1847, and Galatians through Colossians, 1 and 2 Peter in 1848 and Romans, 1 and 2 Corinthians, Hebrews and Revelation in 1849. Their work was published by the Cherokee Baptist Mission. The full New Testament was published by the American Bible Society in 1860.

With the help of Stephen Foreman, Worcester also translated portions of Psalms, Proverbs, and Isaiah.

Jonah, translated by Amory N. Chamberlain, was published in Tahlequah in 1888. Joshua was at an advanced stage of translation, and was perhaps even completed  but was never published.

A "corrected version" of old Testament portions, prepared by M.A. Pearson, was published in 1953 by the American Bible Society.

Revisions of John (1948) and the New Testament (1951) were published in Westville, Oklahoma.

In 1965 the Perkins School of Theology published a translation of Haggai by Jack and Anna Kilpatrick.

In 2001, The Cherokee Bible project [501(c)3], with permission of the American Bible Society, placed the book of John online in both Cherokee Syllabary and in Latin phonetic transliteration and accompanying English translations. This was and is a bilingual version available starting with the gospel of John. The earliest remaining example of this is from 2003.  The addition of phonetics with syllabary had never been done on a scale of this project, and was suggested by Rev. James "BO" Parrish in discussions with him in May 2000.  All postings by the Cherokee Bible Project are published under a Creative Commons license in order to make it widely available for all Cherokee speakers and students.

The Cherokee Bible Project 2001 bilingual passages were speedily followed by postings of the entire New Testament as well as portions of the Old Testament that were available in 2005, including the entire books of Jonah, Haggai, Genesis, Exodus, and portions of many others including Kings, Proverbs, Psalms, Isaiah, Samuel, and Obadiah.  The printed copy of Haggai was donated by a generous supporter after it was located in a library discard and posted online in 2013. After consideration for the size of the project and to save costs, it was moved to google sites for hosting.

In 2012, the Cherokee Bible Project highlighted the section of the words of Jesus and these were changed to red in the New Testament.  Later formatting issues on google sites have not allowed some of that to remain but a majority of it is still viewable. During this time, the Cherokee Unicode underwent significant changes and much of the work had to be heavily edited and replaced with the latest available for ease of reading.  
In 2009, the bilingual Spanish Site was under development and subsequently posted online for Spanish Speakers who wish to read the Cherokee Bible.  It is dependent upon volunteers and is in development.

In 2006, Timothy Legg began a project to compare the English and Cherokee translations of the New Testament, with verse-by-verse scans and transcriptions.  In 2019, Legg abandoned that website and a copy was published to another site.

In 2015, A group of fluent speakers and associates produced a bilingual version of the Scriptures in English and Cherokee. Bro. Bob Doom, Asheville, North Carolina, and acknowledge the participation of the following:
the Cherokee Indian Missionary Baptist Association of Cherokee of North Carolina, for their financial help and spiritual support; the
proofreaders Dennis Sixkiller, Anna Sixkiller, David Crawler, all from Oklahoma, and Marie Junaluska of Cherokee, North Carolina; Bro. Gil Breedlove, Pastor, Boiling Springs Baptist Church, Whittier, North Carolina, for the countless hours of typing, editing and preparing this work for publication, Pastor Brandon Harrell, Bethesda Baptist Church, Flat Rock, NC, and Sis. Neta Cox, Grace Fellowship Baptist Church, Arden, NC, both for English
proofreading.

In the following year of 2016, a limited selection of passages from the Old Testament were published in a bilingual version of English and Cherokee and the following were acknowledged: Bro. Bob Doom, Global Bible Society, Asheville, North Carolina, for advice, fundraising, and the securing of the printed portion of this work; the Perkins School of Theology, Southern Methodist University, Dallas Texas for their publishing of the Book of Haggai in manuscript form, and for the translators, Anna and Jack Kilpatrick of Oklahoma (both deceased,) who translated the Book of Haggai in 1955. Proofreaders were Dennis Sixkiller, Anna Sixkiller, David Crawler, all of Oklahoma, Marie Junaluska of Cherokee, NC. Last but not least Bro. Gil Breedlove, Pastor, Boiling Springs Baptist Church, Whittier, North Carolina.

References

External links
American Bible Society Translation 1860
Old and New Testaments Cherokee Bible Project
Cherokee New Testament Online

Cherokee
Cherokee language